Alpine saxifrage is a common name for several different plants and may refer to:

 In Eurasia, it usually means Micranthes nivalis (Snow saxifrage)
 In North America, it usually means Micranthes nidifica (Peak saxifrage)
 One of the common names of Saxifraga paniculata is alpine saxifrage
 Alpine saxifrage is a common name for Saxifraga gaspensis

See also
 Saxifraga